Agonoleptus convexulus is an insect-eating ground beetle of the Agonoleptus genus. It was first discovered in Cuba.

References

convexulus
Beetles described in 1934